Brian Chumney is an American sound editor. He was nominated for an Academy Award in the category Best Sound for the film West Side Story.

Selected filmography 
 West Side Story (2021; co-nominated with Tod A. Maitland, Gary Rydstrom, Andy Nelson and Shawn Murphy)

References

External links 

Living people
Place of birth missing (living people)
Year of birth missing (living people)
American sound editors
Middle Tennessee State University alumni